Ecballium is a genus of flowering plants in the family Cucurbitaceae containing a single species, Ecballium elaterium, also called the squirting cucumber or exploding cucumber (not the same plant as Cyclanthera brachystachya). Its unusual common name derives from the ripe fruit squirting a stream of mucilaginous liquid containing its seeds as a means of seed dispersal, an example of rapid plant movement.

Distribution
E. elaterium is native to Europe, northern Africa, and temperate areas of Asia, and is considered an invasive species. It is grown as an ornamental plant elsewhere, and in some places it has naturalized.

Seed dispersal
The tissue in the fruit of the Ecballium elaterium  that surrounds the seeds is thin walled, facilitating the propulsive release of seeds by "squirting". Pressure to expel the seeds is created by the increased concentration of glucoside and elaterinidin in low volumes of cytoplasm, leading to an osmotic pressure of up to 27 atms. The pressure-building method may depend on the Phloem sieve tubes, indicating that the squirting mechanism can be decreased in water stressed conditions.

The fruit also uses hygroscopic movement and stored elastic energy to squirt the seeds out of the fruit. This method is done passively where the fruit changes its structure as it dehydrates and deteriorates, causing movement. This movement may be due to coiling, bending, or twisting cells to change its morphological shape as the cells dry. Because drying cells are mostly made up of cell wall, the shape is determined by the cell wall, providing a method for catapulting of seeds to eject them out of the plant.

Sudden movements in plant tissues are prone to different types of mechanical instabilities. In the case of E. elaterium, due to the relationship between the duration of movement and the size of the tissue, the plant tissue fractures. Effectiveness of the dispersal seems to be low as a study found that even though the E. elaterium could have sprayed its seed to the whole plot, the size and location of the infested areas remained relatively similar.

History in folk medicine

Elaterium is the cucurbitacin extract used in ancient history as a purgative in folk medicine. Extracted from the juice of the fruit of E. elaterium, elaterium was discovered by Stirling in 1835. Elaterin is extracted from elaterium by chloroform and then precipitated by ether. It has the formula C32H44O7. It forms colorless scales which have a bitter taste, with evidence as a poison when consumed through the nose or mouth. The British pharmacopeia contained a preparation, the Pulvis Elaterini Compositus.

According to the Encyclopædia Britannica Eleventh Edition, "[t]he action of this extract resembles that of the saline aperients, but is much more powerful. It is the most active hydragogue purgative known, 'causing also much depression and violent griping'. When injected subcutaneously, it is inert, as its action is entirely dependent upon its admixture with the bile. The drug is undoubtedly valuable in cases of dropsy and Bright's disease, and also in cases of cerebral haemorrhage, threatened or present. It must not be used except in urgent cases, and must invariably be employed with the utmost care, especially if the state of the heart be unsatisfactory."

In the 21st century, elaterium and its constituents are considered a poison, with several case reports of hospitalization, edema of the uvula, and necrosis of the nasal mucosa resulting from nasal or oral consumption.

References

External links
 Comprehensive profile for Ecballium elaterium

Cucurbitoideae
Abortifacients
Monotypic Cucurbitaceae genera
Laxatives